Anderdon is a surname, and may refer to:

 Henry Murray-Anderdon (1848–1922), cricket administrator
 James Hughes Anderdon (1790–1879), English banker, slave owner and art collector
 John Anderdon (1792–1874), English writer
 John Proctor Anderdon (1760–1846), English merchant, slave owner and art collector, father of James Hughes Anderdon and John Anderdon
 William Henry Anderdon (1816–1890), English Jesuit and writer, son of John Anderdon